The Way West is a 1967 American Western film directed by Andrew V. McLaglen and starring Kirk Douglas, Robert Mitchum, and Richard Widmark. The supporting cast features Lola Albright, Jack Elam, Sally Field and Stubby Kaye. Ostensibly based on the Pulitzer Prize winning novel of the same name by A. B. Guthrie, Jr., the film is a drama about a band of settlers traveling by covered wagon train to Oregon in 1843. It includes on-location cinematography by William H. Clothier. Sam Elliott made his feature film debut as an uncredited Missouri townsman.

Plot
U.S. Senator William Tadlock (Kirk Douglas) is leaving his home in Missouri in 1843, heading west on the Oregon Trail by wagon train. His son and slave come along, with Dick Summers (Robert Mitchum) as a hired guide. Joining them on the expedition are farmer Lije Evans (Richard Widmark), his wife Rebecca (Lola Albright), and 16-year-old son Brownie (Michael McGreevey). Among others there are also the newlyweds Johnnie (Michael Witney) and Amanda Mack (Katherine Justice), plus the Fairman and McBee families.

Shy young wife Amanda isn't satisfying his needs, so Johnnie gets drunk and strays with young Mercy McBee (Sally Field). He also shoots at what he drunkenly thinks is a wolf, and ends up killing a Sioux chief's son. Tadlock knows that no other form of justice will do for the Indians if the wagon train is being pursued by them out of vengeance, so he hangs Johnnie, for the safety of the traveling party, but to their outrage. On the trail, it turns out Mercy is now pregnant as well, and Brownie proposes marriage to her.

Tadlock's son is killed in a stampede, causing the senator to be so distraught that he becomes harsh and despotic towards his charges. The last straw comes when Tadlock destroys Rebecca Evans' antique clock after Lije Evans refuses to abandon it. A fight ensues when Tadlock is attacked by Evans, for which Tadlock retaliates by trying to shoot Evans, only for Summers to stop him. The others form a lynch mob and attempt to hang Tadlock, but Evans talks them out of it and now takes charge of the trek.

Nearly to the end, the trek reaches a steep ravine, which offers the only shortcut to their destination. Rebecca Evans shows the others Tadlock's grand plan, and Evans relinquishes command back to Tadlock. The settlers lower their possessions, livestock, and each other down the steep escarpment to reach the wagon road to the Willamette Valley. Emotionally destroyed by the loss of Johnnie, Amanda Mack cuts the rope Tadlock is descending on, causing the senator to plunge to his death. Amanda runs off into the desert, but the others, after commemorating Tadlock's efforts, press on to Oregon. Summers stays behind, departing to parts unknown.

Production
Andrew McLaglen recalled that though United Artists was pleased with the film, they wanted 22 minutes at the beginning of the film cut out to reduce the running time.

The film is notable for being the first big-budget western since 1930's widescreen John Wayne spectacle The Big Trail to show pioneers lowering a wagon train over a cliff with ropes.

This was the third time that Mitchum and Douglas appeared in a film together, following Out of the Past (1947) and The List of Adrian Messenger (1963). Douglas had previously filmed another A.B. Guthrie novel, The Big Sky.

Filming took place in Tucson, Arizona, and various places in Oregon, including Bend, Christmas Valley, and the sand dunes and lost forest in Crooked River Gorge.

Reception
Though noted for its exceptional cast and professional cinematography, the film had mixed reviews—often cool to the work of the director and scriptwriter—and was commonly described as something less than the classic work of contemporary Western-movie director John Ford. It was described as lacking consistent story lines, being a collection of disjointed, rushed incidents, connected by long pauses and grand scenery. It gained some notoriety for its sexual themes and innuendoes, beyond the movie norms of the year when it debuted (1967).

While critic Roger Ebert gave it mild praise, other modern reviewers in The New York Times, TV Guide, Variety and  others gave it middle-to-low marks. Metacritic averaged the modern reviews as a 42% rating.

Cast
 Kirk Douglas as Sen. William J. Tadlock
 Robert Mitchum as Dick Summers
 Richard Widmark as Captain Lije Evans
 Lola Albright as Rebecca Evans
 Jack Elam as Preacher Weatherby
 Michael Witney as Johnnie Mack
 Sally Field as Mercy McBee
 Stubby Kaye as Sam Fairman
 Katherine Justice as Amanda Mack
 Michael McGreevey as Brownie Evans
 Connie Sawyer as Mrs. McBee
 Harry Carey, Jr. as Mr. McBee
 Paul Lukather as Mr. Turley
 Eve McVeagh as Mrs. Masters
 Roy Glenn as Saunders
 Patric Knowles as Colonel Grant (based on Captain Walter Colquhoun Grant)
 Paul Wexler as Barber (uncredited)
 Sam Elliott as Missouri townsman (uncredited)

References

External links
 
 
 
 

1967 films
1967 Western (genre) films
1960s English-language films
American Western (genre) films
Films based on American novels
Films based on Western (genre) novels
Films directed by Andrew McLaglen
Films produced by Harold Hecht
Films scored by Bronisław Kaper
Films set in 1847
Films set in Oregon
Films shot in Bend, Oregon
Films shot in Tucson, Arizona
Films shot in Oregon
United Artists films
1960s historical drama films
American historical drama films
1967 drama films
Revisionist Western (genre) films
1960s American films